Carmageddon is a vehicular combat video game released for personal computers in 1997. It was produced by Stainless Games and published by Interplay Productions and Sales Curve Interactive. It was later ported to other platforms, and spawned a series.

In 2011, Stainless Games obtained the rights to Carmageddon from Square Enix Europe. iOS and Android ports were released in 2012 and 2013, respectively. THQ Nordic acquired the rights to the Carmageddon series from Stainless Games in December 2018.

Gameplay

The player races a vehicle against several other computers controlled competitors in various settings, including city, mine, and industrial areas.  The player has a certain amount of time to complete each race, but more time may be gained by collecting bonuses, damaging the competitors' cars, or by running over pedestrians. Unusually for a racing game, checkpoints do not extend the time limit.

Races are completed by either completing the course as one would a normal racing game, "wasting" (wrecking) all other race cars, or killing all pedestrians on the level. The game includes thirty-six racetracks, played across eleven different locations. The game features three instrumental remixes from Fear Factory's album of 1995, Demanufacture.

Development
The game that became Carmageddon started out as 3D Destruction Derby, a banger racing sim prototyped by Stainless Software. This was signed by SCi in 1995, with the condition that it be made into a licensed game to guarantee popularity. Initially, SCi wanted to use the Mad Max license, but was unable to find out who owned the rights to the franchise. It instead secured the Death Race 2000 license, as a sequel to the original film was at that time planned.

According to head programmer Patrick Buckland, the initial concept stemmed from team members getting bored while playing racing games, leading them to ultimately drive in the wrong direction and crash into other cars. They decided it made sense to create a game where this was the objective to begin with. Shortly after, Psygnosis released a game with this same concept, Destruction Derby.

The notion of running over pedestrians was added to distinguish the game from Destruction Derby and arouse controversy. However, there several recent games involves running over pedestrians, such as Quarantine and Die Hard Trilogy. Rob Henderson from SCi suggested increasing the potential for controversy by awarding the player points for the pedestrian kills.

The sequel to Death Race 2000 was later cancelled, but by this point SCi were impressed enough by Stainless's work to try creating their own IP. The name Carmageddon was coined, and development proceeded with the designers allowed unusually free rein with regard to the content of the game.

The game uses the BRender engine, which Stainless Software were already thoroughly familiar with; one of their previous contracts was to port BRender to Macintosh and build the corresponding tools and demos. The PlayStation conversion was subcontracted to developer Elite, with the plan to release the PC and PlayStation versions simultaneously. Buckland anticipated that Elite would have problems with the conversion due to Carmageddons open environments.

Release
Carmageddon was originally released for MS-DOS, Microsoft Windows, and Mac OS in 1997. It won the "Game of the Year" trophy in the 1997 PC Zone reader awards and "Driving Game of the Year" 1997. An expansion pack, Splat Pack, was released in 1997. It included new tracks, vehicles, environments, network levels, and 3Dfx support.

The Carmageddon Max Pack, released on February 17, 1998, bundled the original game and its expansion pack into one package. As a bonus, it also included a strategy guide, mousepad, and a leather car key chain with Carmageddons logo. The Max Pack was nominated for the 1998 Computer Action Game of the Year D.I.C.E. Award.

A port was in development for the Gizmondo, but was never released. Carmageddon and its expansion Splat Pack were released on GOG.com on 27 September 2012 for modern operating systems. In addition, a port of the game for Apple's mobile devices (iPod Touch, iPhone, iPad) was released on 17 October the same year. In July 2011, the City of Los Angeles launched a massive media campaign under the title "Carmageddon" to warn drivers about a major closure on the 405 Freeway during the weekend of July 15–17. Stainless Games capitalized on the coincidence to promote the upcoming Carmageddon releases by announcing on the official web site that "L.A. Celebrates Carmageddon" and "Yes, it’s official! The news that Carmageddon is back has been such a hit in California, that the authorities have decided to dedicate a whole weekend to the game!"

A port for Android based devices was released on 10 May 2013.

Controversy

In many countries (including Germany and, for a short time, the United Kingdom), the first release of the game was censored.

They contained zombies with green blood or robots with black oil instead of people, as running over the non human figures was considered more acceptable by their respective ratings boards. In the United Kingdom, the BBFC refused to certify the game unless all blood and gore was removed. After ten months of appeal, the BBFC certified the original version.

In some countries, the game was banned completely, including Brazil. In Australia, the game was passed completely uncut with a MA15+ rating.

Reception

According to the co-founders of Stainless Games, about two million copies of the Carmageddon series were sold in total. NPD Techworld, a firm that tracked sales in the United States, reported 118,500 units sold of Carmageddons computer version by December 2002.

GameSpot was enamoured of the open ended, chaotic nature of the game, commenting that "Carmageddon touches that particular collective nerve that fuses the wholesome popularity of the All-American Racing Game with the homicidal singularity of the 70s cult film into an onscreen experience that can only be compared to the kind of automotive mayhem that a five-year-old American male wreaks with his Matchbox and Hot Wheels cars." Next Generation stated that "if you're willing to sweep your morals under the rug for a while, and shamelessly commit auto homicide on a grand scale, then Carmageddon is an absolute blast." GamePro gave a more mixed review, commenting that the game is intense and high on longevity, but that its focus on wanton destruction and gore is in questionable taste and ultimately to the detriment of the gameplay. They also found the graphics mediocre and the controls when using a keyboard to be "frustrating and sluggish".

Legacy
The game was successful enough to become a series. The other games in the main series are:
 Carmageddon II: Carpocalypse Now (1998)
 Carmageddon TDR 2000 (2000)
 Carmageddon: Reincarnation (2015)
SCi had originally planned Carmageddon 4 for a release in the end of 2005. Little to no information was released about the game, then SCi (at the time owned by Eidos) put development on hold for unspecified reasons. SCi and Eidos went on to focus on other projects, while Square Enix Europe obtained the series's intellectual property rights.

Reboot
A reboot of the series, Carmageddon: Reincarnation was developed by Stainless Games, who re-acquired the rights to the Carmageddon name, releasing in May 2015. The game is downloadable for Microsoft Windows. Funding for the game has come partially from a Kickstarter campaign and donations through their main website. Further funds were secured from Les Edgar (co-founder of Bullfrog Productions). An updated version of the game, Max Damage, was released the following year for Windows, PlayStation 4, and Xbox One.

THQ Nordic
In 2018, THQ Nordic bought the rights to the Carmageddon intellectual property. On August 3, 2021, THQ Nordic announced a Carmageddon-themed tournament in their Wreckfest racing game. It includes two race tracks, "Bleak City" and "Devil's Canyon", and the Eagle R car from Max Damage.

See also
 GTI Club
 Interstate '76
 Midtown Madness
 Streets of SimCity

References

External links

1997 video games
Android (operating system) games
Blazing Renderer games
Cancelled Gizmondo games
Censored video games
Fiction about death games
DOS games
Games commercially released with DOSBox
Interplay Entertainment games
Embracer Group franchises
IOS games
Classic Mac OS games
Obscenity controversies in video games
Racing video games
Vehicular combat games
Video games developed in the United Kingdom
Video games featuring female protagonists
Video games with expansion packs
Windows games
Multiplayer and single-player video games
HandyGames games
Stainless Games games